The Piedmontese regional election of 1980 took place on 8 June 1980.

Events
Christian Democracy resulted narrowly ahead of the Italian Communist Party. After the election, the Italian Communist Party and the Italian Socialist Party decided to continue their political cooperation and formed a coalition government with the PSDI under the leadership of Socialist Enzo Enrietti.

However in 1983 the Socialists switched sides and Aldo Viglione, a Socialist who had been President of the Region from 1975 to 1980, formed a new regional government with the Christian Democrats, the Italian Democratic Socialist Party, the Italian Liberal Party and the Italian Republican Party (Pentapartito).

Results

Source: Ministry of the Interior

Elections in Piedmont
1980 elections in Italy